The National Border Service, also called SENAFRONT (abbreviation for ) is a police force specialized in the land border area and branch of the Panamanian Public Forces. Its mission is to protect Panama's land borders and protect its sovereignty and territorial integrity and protect rights and freedoms of people, maintain public order, prevent and investigate crimes within their jurisdictions.

Created in 2008, it is the border guard branch of the Panamanian Public Forces.

Background
In case of emergency or a foreign attack on Panama, SENAFRONT is the principal entity of the security forces trained to plan, organize, direct and execute all actions that ensure the security of the territory and population within the sovereign jurisdiction of the land territories of Panama with attachment and loyalty to constitutional and legal order established in the country.

The Service was established in 2008, with Frank Abrego as its first Director General on the basis of the Border Police Directorate of the National Police.

Structure
The SENAFRONT is headed by a Director General, which is appointed by President of Panama with the recommendation of the Minister of Public Security per article 14 of Decree Law No. 8 of August 20, 2008.

At its foundation it had one brigade, the 1st (Southeastern) Border Brigade organized into the following:

 Brigade HQ
 Caribbean Battalion 
 Central Battalion 
 Pacific Battalion
 Fluvial Battalion Sambu
 General José De Fabregas Border Battalion
 Service Support Battalion

The 2nd Border Brigade, raised in 2008, is responsible for the Caribbean coast segments of the border and is organized into and HQ and 4 subordinate battalions:
 Puerto Obaldía Battalion
 Nargana Battalion 
 Ustupu Battalion
 Support Battalion

The then Western Battalion provided border security on the Costa Rica border, in 2017 it was transformed into the basis of the 4th Border Brigade and split into two battalions in 2020. The 4th Brigade is organized into a HQ and the following:

 Guapito Battalion
 Second Lieutenant (Border) Aurelio Serracín Border Battalion
 COL Tomás Armuelles Brder Battalion
 Support Battalion

In 2020 the 3rd East Panama Brigade was raised to support law enforcement and border operations in Panama Province and Madungandí Township. Its ORBAT is organized as:

 Brigade HQ
 Chepo Battalion
 Torti Battalion
 Support Battalion

The 5th Special Forces Brigade is made up of a Special Forces Battalion, Special Boat Unit and a Motorized Infantry Battalion. The Special Forces battalion is organized into a headquarters and 3 companies as follows:
 Reconnaissance Company and Combat Anti-Narcotics (RECOM).
 Jungle Operations Company.
 Cobra Assault and Infiltration.

The brigade also handles K-9 and SAR operations.

Its agents are often trained by the United States Army as there are daily clashes with FARC guerrillas on the border with Colombia.

Ranks
Commissioned officer ranks

Other ranks

Equipment

Small arms

Artillery

Vehicles

External links 
 The official website of SENAFRONT(spanish)

References 

 

Panama
Borders of Panama